Wasko may refer to:

 Joseph Wasko (born 1931), French former professional racing cyclist
 Mike Wasko (born 1964), American former bobsledder
 Piotr Waśko (1961–2023), Polish politician
 Ryszard Wasko (born 1947), Polish artist in multiple media, curator and event organizer
 Mount Wasko, Ross Dependency, Antarctica